Ančić is a Croatian family name that may refer to:

 Ivan Ančić (1624–1685), theological writer
 Ivica Ančić (born 1979), professional male tennis player, brother of Mario and Sanja
 Mario Ančić (born 1984), professional male tennis player, brother of Ivica and Sanja
 Sanja Ančić (born 1988), professional female tennis player, sister of Ivica and Mario

See also
 ANCIC (organization), French NGO that provides advice and support to women on contraception and abortion

Croatian surnames
Slavic-language surnames
Patronymic surnames